Crystal cake is one of the traditional desserts in Weinan city of eastern Shaanxi, China. It has more than 800 years of history. Crystal cake was first invented in Xiagui during the Song Dynasty, then it spread throughout the region. It gets its name from its filling, which is glittering and translucent, like crystal.

The crust is made with wheat flour, starch and oil, the filling is a mixture of granulated sugar, lard, and pounded rock candy, candied fruits and nuts.

In southern China, small pastries with a translucent crust made with wheat starch as a main component, and filled with sweet bean paste, are also called "crystal cake".

See also

 Chinese bakery products
 Chinese desserts
 List of desserts
 Mooncake
 Suncake (disambiguation)

Notes

References
Millennium crystal cake flipping taste buds
Baqiao an old black dens made crystal cake overnight smash Provincial Quality Supervision Bureau
Villages in making crystal cake Shaanxi Provincial Quality Supervision night specialty investigated dens
Shaanxi snack crystal cake allusions
Christine De Mao Crystal Cake
Provincial Quality Supervision Bureau checks show: "De Mao Gong" crystal cake unqualified
Shaanxi Quality Supervision Bureau of Food Inspection Results Germany Mao Christine crystal cake is listed blacklist
Shaanxi snack crystal cake allusions
How to Make Perfect Moon Cakes for Chinese Mid-Autumn Festival

Further reading
 Crystal Shaanxi snack cake story

Chinese desserts
Cakes
Shaanxi cuisine